The 1990 Barnet Council election took place on 3 May 1990 to elect members of Barnet London Borough Council in London, England. The whole council was up for election and the Conservative party stayed in overall control of the council.

Background

Election result
Overall turnout in the election was 50.0%.

|}

Ward results

Arkley

Brunswick Park

Burnt Oak

Childs Hill

Colindale

East Barnet

East Finchley

Vis was a sitting councillor for Woodhouse ward.

Edgware

Finchley

Friern Barnet

Garden Suburb

Golders Green

Hadley

Hale

Hendon

Mill Hill

St Paul’s

Totteridge

West Hendon

Woodhouse

By-elections between 1990 and 1994

Burnt Oak

The by-election was called following the resignation of Cllr. Malcolm G. Sargeant.

Mill Hill

The by-election was called following the death of Cllr. Denis L. Dippel.

Garden Suburb

The by-election was called following the resignation of Cllr. Veronica C. Soskin.

West Hendon

The by-election was called following the resignation of Cllr. Timothy J. K. Sims.

References

1990
1990 London Borough council elections